Mohamed Siad may refer to:

Mohamed Siad Barre, Somali military dictator and President of the Somali Democratic Republic from 1969 to 1991
Mohammed Said Hersi Morgan, son-in-law of Siad Barre and minister of defense of Somalia
Mohamed Siad, alleged Toronto drug dealer involved in Toronto Mayor Rob Ford's video scandal
Yusuf Mohammed Siad, Somali warlord, Islamist and former minister